These are the results of the November 6, 2005, municipal elections in Quebec for the region of Côte-Nord. Some mayors and councillors were elected without opposition from October 14, 2005.

Aguanish
All elected without opposition.
 Mayor: Richard Noël
 Councillor 1: Gaston Blais
 Councillor 2: Steve Noël
 Councillor 3: Hélène Arseneau
 Councillor 4: Denis Rochette
 Councillor 5: Yvon Duguay
 Councillor 6: Louiselle Blais

Baie-Comeau
Mayor and councillors 1, 2, 4, 5 and 6 were elected without opposition.
 Mayor: Ivo Di Piazza
 Councillor 1: Alain Larouche
 Councillor 2: Raymond Coulombe
 Councillor 3: Christine Brisson
 Councillor 4: Carole Deschênes
 Councillor 5: Jean Thériault
 Councillor 6: Réal Montigny
 Councillor 7: Reina Savoie-Jourdain
 Councillor 8: Yvon Boudreau

Baie-Johan-Beetz
All elected without opposition.
 Mayor: Martin Côté
 Councillor 1: Vacancy
 Councillor 2: Clément Tanguay
 Councillor 3: Vacancy
 Councillor 4: Carmelle Tanguay
 Councillor 5: Anne-Marie Tanguay Bourque
 Councillor 6: Jacques Devost

Baie-Trinité
All elected without opposition.
 Mayor: Marcel Poulin
 Councillor 1: Gilles Dupuis
 Councillor 2: Gilles Dubuc
 Councillor 3: Réjean Langlois
 Councillor 4: Manon Lefrançois
 Councillor 5: Yolande Comeau
 Councillor 6: Lorrain Boucher

Blanc-Sablon
Electors: 925
Voters: 516 (56%)
Councillors 5 and 6 were elected without opposition.
 Mayor: Armand Joncas
 Councillor 1: Lyndon Burke
 Councillor 2: Dawson Osborne
 Councillor 3: Colette Morency
 Councillor 4: Randy Hobbs
 Councillor 5: Dino Penney
 Councillor 6: Linda Jones

Bonne-Espérance
Electors: 687
Voters: 468 (68%)
 Mayor: Lionel Roberts
 Councillor 1: Susan Thomas
 Councillor 2: Tony Roberts
 Councillor 3: Alisa Griffin
 Councillor 4: Annie-May Anderson
 Councillor 5: Harrison J. Thomas
 Councillor 6: Marvin Buckle

Chute-aux-Outardes
Electors: 1 446
Voters: 1 042 (72%)
 Mayor: Arlette Girard
 Councillor 1: Mario Gallant
 Councillor 2: Guy Malouin
 Councillor 3: Reno Ross
 Councillor 4: Pierre Langlois
 Councillor 5: Dominique Ouellet
 Councillor 6: Yannick Bourgeois

Colombier
Electors: 929
Voters: 557 (60%)
Councillors 1, 3, 4 and 5 were elected without opposition.
 Mayor: Jean-Rock Barbeau
 Councillor 1: Noël Boulianne
 Councillor 2: Lise Jalbert
 Councillor 3: Laurette Tremblay
 Councillor 4: Jocelyn Tremblay
 Councillor 5: Katia Lavoie
 Councillor 6: Patrick Bourgoing

Fermont
Electors: 1 865
Voters: 835 (45%)
Councillors 3, 5 and 6 were elected without opposition.
 Mayor: Lise Pelletier
 Councillor 1: Claude Meilleur
 Councillor 2: Janelle Gauthier
 Councillor 3: Yann St-Pierre
 Councillor 4: Dave Bouchard
 Councillor 5: Brigitte Poitras
 Councillor 6: Martin St-Laurent

Forestville
Mayor and councillors 3, 5 and 6 were elected without opposition.
 Mayor: Gaston Tremblay
 Councillor 1: Guy Racine
 Councillor 2: Steeve Gagnon
 Councillor 3: Sophia St-Pierre
 Councillor 4: Martin Maltais
 Councillor 5: Lily Imbeault
 Councillor 6: Rachel St-Louis

Franquelin
Mayor and councillors 1, 2, 3, 5 and 6 were elected without opposition.
 Mayor: Michel Levesque
 Councillor 1: Manon Charest
 Councillor 2: Maurice Lebouthiller
 Councillor 3: Laurent St-Pierre
 Councillor 4: Nicole Baron
 Councillor 5: Magella Cyr
 Councillor 6: Eric Mansour

Godbout
All elected without opposition.
 Mayor: Patrick Larocque
 Councillor 1: Gabriel Cormier
 Councillor 2: Claude Leblond
 Councillor 3: Francine Vaillancourt
 Councillor 4: Sylvie Morin
 Councillor 5: Rodrigue Morin
 Councillor 6: Claude Aubichon

Gros-Mécatina
Electors: 475
Voters: 324 (68%)
 Mayor: Randy Jones
 Councillor 1: Bradley Organ
 Councillor 2: Eldon Bobbit
 Councillor 3: Shawn Buffit
 Councillor 4: Corey Robertson
 Councillor 5: Anthony Gallichon
 Councillor 6: Denis Fequet

Havre-Saint-Pierre
Electors: 2 600
Voters: 1 867 (72%)
All councillors were elected without opposition.
 Mayor: Pierre Cormier
 Councillor 1: Gilles Thibeault
 Councillor 2: Lucienne Girard
 Councillor 3: Réal Jomphe
 Councillor 4: François Cormier
 Councillor 5: Renaud Jomphe
 Councillor 6: Lucien Duouis

Les Bergeronnes
Mayor and councillors 1, 4 and 5 were elected without opposition.
 Mayor: Francis Bouchard
 Councillor 1: Julien Dufour
 Councillor 2: Nicole Gagnon
 Councillor 3: Luc Gilbert
 Councillor 4: Martial Hovington
 Councillor 5: Pierrette Larouche
 Councillor 6: Patrice Imbeault

Les Escoumins
Electors: 1 658
Voters: 1 050 (63%)
Councillors 3, 4, 5 and 6 were elected without opposition.
 Mayor: Pierre Laurencelle
 Councillor 1: Bernard Martel
 Councillor 2: Germain Moreau
 Councillor 3: Sonia April
 Councillor 4: André Desrosiers
 Councillor 5: France Dubé
 Councillor 6: Louis Lapointe

L'Île-d'Anticosti
Electors: 215
Voters: 160 (74%)
 Mayor: Denis Duteau
 Councillor 1: Stéfan Tremblay
 Councillor 2: Marc Poulin
 Councillor 3: Bertrand Poulin
 Councillor 4: Jean-François Auclair

Longue-Pointe-de-Mingan
All elected without opposition.
 Mayor: Jean-Luc Burgess
 Councillor 1: Pierrot Vaillancourt
 Councillor 2: Allen Albert
 Councillor 3: Kent Ward
 Councillor 4: Jerry Bond
 Councillor 5: Sylvain Loiselle
 Councillor 6: François Ward

Longue-Rive
Electors: 1 240
Voters: 852 (69%)
Councillors 1, 4, 5 and 6 were elected without opposition.
 Mayor: Mario Tremblay
 Councillor 1: Carol Girard
 Councillor 2: Suzanne Martel
 Councillor 3: Yvon Gagnon
 Councillor 4: Renelle Tremblay
 Councillor 5: Charles Gagnon
 Councillor 6: Marc Hervieux

Natashquan
All elected without opposition.
 Mayor: Jacques Landry
 Councillor 1: Vacancy
 Councillor 2: Magella Landry
 Councillor 3: Vacancy
 Councillor 4: Marie-Claude Vigneault
 Councillor 5: Carol Landry
 Councillor 6: Vacancy

Pointe-aux-Outardes
Electors: 1 119
Voters: 654 (58%)
Councillors 1, 2, 4, 5 and 6 were elected without opposition.
 Mayor: Louise Durand
 Councillor 1: André Bossé
 Councillor 2: André Lepage
 Councillor 3: Suzan Montigny
 Councillor 4: Marc Archambault
 Councillor 5: Mario Ross
 Councillor 6: Alain Deschênes

Pointe-Lebel
Electors: 1 527
Voters: 835 (55%)
Councillor 5 was elected without opposition.
 Mayor: Ghislain Beaudin
 Councillor 1: Gino Boucher
 Councillor 2: Jonathan Raymond
 Councillor 3: Pierre Durette
 Councillor 4: André Bossé
 Councillor 5: Gervais Otis
 Councillor 6: Claude Trudel

Portneuf-sur-Mer
All elected without opposition.
 Mayor: Jean-Marie Delaunay
 Councillor 1: Claire Kennedy
 Councillor 2: Alain Manning
 Councillor 3: Gino Jean
 Councillor 4: Antoine Dubé
 Councillor 5: Michel Chamberland
 Councillor 6: Roger Emond

Ragueneau
Electors: 1 221
Voters: 600 (49%)
All councillors were elected without opposition.
 Mayor: Georges-Henri Gagné
 Councillor 1: Samuel Althot
 Councillor 2: Gilles Gagnon
 Councillor 3: Claude Lavoie
 Councillor 4: Claudine Emond
 Councillor 5: Neil Brien
 Councillor 6: Raymonde Martel

Rivière-au-Tonnerre
Mayor and councillors 1, 2, 4, 5 and 6 were elected without opposition.
 Mayor: Jeannot Boudreau
 Councillor 1: Edwin Bond
 Councillor 2: Jean-Marie Roussy
 Councillor 3: Denis Bezeau
 Councillor 4: Jacques Bernier
 Councillor 5: Anne-Marie Boudreau
 Councillor 6: Léona Boudreau

Rivière-Saint-Jean
Mayor and councillors 4 were elected without opposition.
 Mayor: Michel Beaudin
 Councillor 1: Cecil Smith
 Councillor 2: Christian Morissette
 Councillor 3: Marcel Leblanc
 Councillor 4: Réal Poulin
 Councillor 5: Vacancy
 Councillor 6: Vacancy

Sacré-Coeur
Electors: 1 537
Voters: 1 071 (70%)
Councillors 1, 4 and 5 were elected without opposition.
 Mayor: Gilles Pineault
 Councillor 1: Lise Boulianne
 Councillor 2: Janic Boisvert
 Councillor 3: Jean Dufour
 Councillor 4: Anick Aubut
 Councillor 5: Yanick Morin
 Councillor 6: Gilles Dufour

Saint-Augustin
Electors: 528
Voters: 324 (61%)
Councillors 2 and 6 were elected without opposition.
 Mayor: Camille Fequet
 Councillor 1: Randy Maurice
 Councillor 2: Aurele Shattler
 Councillor 3: Zeno Lavallée
 Councillor 4: Ricky Fequet
 Councillor 5: Neil Driscoll
 Councillor 6: Celina Shattler

Tadoussac
Electors: 710
Voters: 469 (66%)
Councillors 3, 4 and 5 were elected without opposition.
 Mayor: Pierre Marquis
 Councillor 1: Dany Tremblay
 Councillor 2: Charles Breton
 Councillor 3: Bruno Therrien
 Councillor 4: Gilbert Perron
 Councillor 5: Joëlle Pierre
 Councillor 6: Micheline Simard

2005 Quebec municipal elections
Côte-Nord